Kiley may refer to:

Given name

Kiley Boynton, American acrobatic gymnast
Kiley Dean (born 1982), American contemporary R&B singer
Kiley Gaffney, Australian musician and performance artist
Kiley May (born 1986/1987), actor, filmmaker, and two-spirit activist

Surname
Bob Kiley (1935–2016), public transit planner and supervisor
Deborah Scaling Kiley (1958–2012), American sailor, author, motivational speaker, and businesswoman
Dan Kiley (1912–2004), American landscape architect in the modernist style
James Kiley (1865–1953), British businessman and Liberal Party politician, MP from 1916 to 1922
John Kiley (1912–1993), organist at Fenway Park from 1953 to 1989 and at the Boston Garden from 1941 to 1984
John Kiley (baseball) (1859–1940), Major League Baseball outfielder and pitcher
Kevin C. Kiley (born 1950), Surgeon General of the United States Army, commander of the U.S. Army Medical Command
Kevin Kiley (sportscaster), American sportscaster and talk show host
Kevin Kiley (wrestler) (born 1981), American professional wrestler (ring name Alex Riley)
Kevin Kiley (politician), born 1985, California Assemblyman and gubernatorial candidate
Moses E. Kiley (1876–1953), Canadian-born prelate of the Roman Catholic Church
Nathan Kiley (born 1981), English stage actor
Richard Kiley (1922–1999), American stage, television, and film actor
Roger Kiley (1900–1974), United States federal judge
Sam Kiley (born 1964), Defence and Security Editor of Sky News
Tony Kiley, drummer in The Blow Monkeys, an alternative rock band

Fictional characters
Okayasu Kiley, in the English-language version of the manga Peach Girl

See also
Kailey, a surname and feminine given name
Keighley (disambiguation)
Kylee (born 1994), Japanese singer
Kylie (disambiguation)
Kyly Clarke (AKA Kyly, born 1981) Australian former model
Rilo Kiley, American indie rock band formed in Los Angeles, active from 1998 to 2013